is a Japanese football player.

Club career
Maekawa was born in Hiroshima Prefecture on September 8, 1994. After graduating from Kansai University, he joined J1 League club Vissel Kobe in 2017.

International career
He was called up to the senior Japan squad in March 2021.

Career statistics

Last update: 12 October 2022

References

External links

1994 births
Living people
Kansai University alumni
Association football people from Hiroshima Prefecture
Japanese footballers
J1 League players
Vissel Kobe players
Association football goalkeepers